Qaleh-ye Gareh (also Romanized as Qal‘eh-ye Gareh and Qal‘eh Garreh) is a village in Shahid Modarres Rural District, in the Central District of Shushtar County, Khuzestan Province, Iran. At the 2006 census, its population was 30, in 6 families.

References 

Populated places in Shushtar County